KF Gostima is an Albanian football club based in the small municipal unit of Gostimë. They are currently not competing in the senior football league.

References

Gostimë